

All India Radio stations

AM/MW radio stations
 All India Radio Thiruvananthapuram - 1161
 All India Radio Alapuzha - 576
 All India Radio Thrissur - 630
 All India Radio Kozhikode - 684
 All India Radio Kavaratti - 1584

SW radio stations
 All India Radio Thiruvananthapuram - 5010,7290

FM radio stations
 All India Radio Ananthapuri FM -Thiruvananthapuram -101.9
 All India Radio Kochi 102.3
 AIR FM Rainbow  Kochi  -107.5  (Music Channel)
 All India Radio Thrissur - 103
 All India Radio Devikulam (Idukki district) - 101.4
 All India Radio Real FM - Kozhikode - 103.6
 All India Radio Manjeri FM (Malappuram district) -102.7
 All India Radio Kannur - 101.5

Private radio (FM and AM) stations

Kannur
 Radio Mango 91.9 (Malayala Manorama Group)
 Red FM 93.5 (Sun Network)
Club FM 94.3 (Mathrubhumi)
 Best FM 95 (Asianet Star Communications) - inactive

Kozhikode
 Radio Mango 91.9 (Malayala Manorama Group)
 Radio Mirchi 92.7 (Times Group)
Red FM 93.5 (Sun Network)
 Club FM 104.8 (Mathrubhumi)

Thrissur
 Red FM 95 (Sun Network)
 Radio Mango 91.9 (Malayala Manorama Group)
 Club FM 94.3 (Mathrubhumi)
 Best FM 95 (Asianet Star Communications)

Kochi
 Radio Mango 91.9 (Malayala Manorama Group)
 Red FM 93.5 (Sun Network)
 Club FM 94.3 (Mathrubhumi)
 Radio Mirchi 104.0 (Times Group)

Alappuzha 
 Radio Mango 92.7 (Malayala Manorama Group)
Club FM 104.8 (Mathrubhumi)

Thiruvananthapuram
 92.7 BIG FM (Reliance Anil Dhirubhai Ambani Group)
 Red FM 93.5 (Sun Network)
 Club FM 94.3 (Mathrubhumi)
 Radio Mirchi 98.3 (Times Group)

Outside Kerala 

 Dubai

 Asianet Radio 657AM
 Radio Asia 1269 AM
 Radio Me 95.3 FM
 Hit FM 96.7
 Oxygen FM 102.4
 Radio Mango 96.2

Community FM Radio stations 
Kerala has 12 Community FM Radio stations .

Thiruvananthapuram

 Radio DC 90.4- (Community Radio by DC School of Management and Technology)

 Kollam

 Community Radio Benziger 107.8 ( Bishop Benziger Nursing College) - Kollam City
 Ente Radio 91.2 (Kerala Rural Development Agency) - Kulasekharapuram

 Pathanamthitta

 Radio MACFAST 90.4 - (Community Radio by Mar Athanasios College for Advanced Studies) - Thiruvalla

Alappuzha

 Global Radio 91.2 FM - (Global Education Net) - Ambalappuzha
Radio Neythal 107.8 (Diocese of Alleppey) - Alappuzha

Kottayam

 Radio Media Village 90.8 (St. Joseph College of Communication) - Changanassery
Radio Mangalam 91.2 (Mangalam College of Engineering) - Ettumanoor

Palakkad

 Ahalia FM 90.4 (Ahalia Healthcare Group) - IIT Palakkad

Wayanad

 Radio Maattoli 90.4 (Wayanad Social Service Society) - Nalloornad - Kerala's first community radio service, it primarily caters farmers and tribals.

Kannur 

 Janvani 90.8 (Academic and Technical Education Development Society) - Panoor

See also 

 Media in Kerala

References 

 
Lists of radio stations in India
Radio stations